Helmut List (born December 12, 1941, Graz) is an Austrian engineer, businessman, and philanthropist. He holds the academic title of Professor Doctor. He is CEO of AVL, (Anstalt für Verbrennungskraftmaschinen List, "List Institute for Combustion Engines") which was founded by his father, the engineer and inventor Hans List, in 1948. AVL operates globally and is based in Graz, capital of Austria's province Styria.

The Helmut-List-Halle is named for him. It is a large multi-purpose cultural venue, serving for many events during the annual Styrian Autumn Festival. The hall features ideal acoustic conditions for classical concerts.

Decorations and awards
 2002: Honorary Ring of Graz
 2003: Wilhelm Exner Medal.
 2005: Grand Decoration of Styria
 2010: Grand Gold Decoration of Styria
 2012: Austrian Cross of Honour for Science and Art, 1st class

References

External links 
 AVL's website
 Helmut-List-Halle

Austrian chief executives
Engineers from Graz
Living people
1941 births
Recipients of the Austrian Cross of Honour for Science and Art, 1st class